József Apró (21 December 1920 – 24 October 2003) was a Hungarian middle-distance runner. He competed in the men's 3000 metres steeplechase at the 1952 Summer Olympics.

References

External links
 

1920 births
2003 deaths
Athletes (track and field) at the 1952 Summer Olympics
Hungarian male middle-distance runners
Hungarian male steeplechase runners
Olympic athletes of Hungary
Place of birth missing
20th-century Hungarian people